Josiah Scott (December 1, 1803 – June 15, 1879) was a Republican politician in the U.S. State of Ohio who was in the Ohio House of Representatives, and was an Ohio Supreme Court Judge 1856–1872.

Josiah Scott was born at Washington County, Pennsylvania, not far from Cannonsburg, where he graduated from Jefferson College (now Washington & Jefferson College) in 1823.  He returned to Jefferson College as a tutor from 1827 to 1829.  He studied law and in 1830 he moved to Bucyrus, Crawford County, Ohio, where he practiced law.

In 1840, Scott was elected to the Ohio House of Representatives for the 39th General Assembly as a Whig. Presidential elector in 1844 for Clay/Frelinghuysen.

In 1856, Scott was nominated by the Republican Party for Judge of the Ohio Supreme Court, and he defeated incumbent Democrat Rufus P. Ranney and a third party candidate with a plurality of the votes in the General Election. Ranney resigned the seat soon after the election, and Scott was seated late in 1856. He was re-elected in 1861, and again in 1866, but declined re-nomination in 1871.

In 1870, Scott developed a method to construct magic squares.

In 1872, Scott returned to Crawford County, and private practice. In 1876, Governor Hayes appointed him to the Supreme Court Commission of Ohio, and he resigned at the end of a three-year term in 1879.

Scott married Elizabeth McCracken on February 8, 1838. They had five children before she died in 1844. Scott married again May 4, 1846 to Susan Elizabeth Moffit, who had no children and died in 1891. He died June 15, 1879 from kidney disease and was buried in Oakwood Cemetery, Bucyrus.

Notes

References

Members of the Ohio House of Representatives
Ohio lawyers
People from Crawford County, Ohio
People from Washington County, Pennsylvania
Justices of the Ohio Supreme Court
Washington & Jefferson College alumni
Washington & Jefferson College faculty
Ohio Republicans
1803 births
1879 deaths
Ohio Whigs
19th-century American politicians
1844 United States presidential electors
American mathematicians
Members of the Supreme Court Commission of Ohio
19th-century American judges
19th-century American lawyers